Stour Row is a village in north Dorset, England, situated beside Duncliffe Hill  southwest of Shaftesbury. It lies within the parish of the neighbouring village of Stour Provost. Stour Row has approximately 150 houses and 300 residents.  It has a village hall, which is used to run regular social events.  Today it has few other amenities, but it had a petrol station, pub and shop prior to the early 1980s. It has a church, All Saints, which was built in 1867 but which has now closed due to falling congregation numbers. The last service was held in the church on 15 October 2015.  Stour Row lies within the SP7 postcode area on the edge of the Blackmore Vale.

History 
Originally, known as Stower Row, it was part of the manor of Stour Provost which itself is mentioned in the Domesday Book simply as ‘Stur’.

The manor and lands of Stower had been granted to Eton College by Henry VI but the manor was later granted to the Provost, Fellows and Scholars of King's College, Cambridge, by Edward IV.  King's College retained possession of much of the land until they sold it in 1925, at which point many farmers and cottagers were able to buy their property as sitting tenants.

Ownership of the  Duncliffe Wood rested with the Forestry Commission by 1980, who in turn put it up for sale for £120,000 in 1984.  The Woodland Trust launched a successful campaign to raise funds through a public appeal and the purchase was completed that year, keeping this wonderful amenity open to the public.

Many of the houses in Stour Row were built alongside the main routes through the village in a typical "Dorset strip" fashion with long thin gardens running alongside the road.  Most date from the eighteenth and nineteenth centuries.  Some of the farms, however, appear to date back far further and many take their names from former owners.  

Formerly the village boasted a pub, The College Arms. It is not certain when the dwelling which housed it became an inn but it may have been around 1829 when Edward Painter, a ‘Common Brewer’ bought the house.  The property was bought by the brewers Hall and Woodhouse in 1963 but they sold it on to the licensee Robert Martin on condition that is ceased to sell liquor, and the pub closed.

Village Hall 
Stour Row village hall is a converted Congregationalist chapel built in 1847 and purchased by the village for £105/1s/6d in 1949 and became the Village Hall, and a registered charity.  Among the necessary alterations a kitchen extension was built at the cost of £361/17s/3d.

During 2013 the Hall underwent major restructuring, redecoration and modernising as a result of the generous contributions of local residents in terms of time and finance. This has provided a clean, bright and airy hall with modern kitchen, a store room and toilet with disabled facilities. In addition, the small garden area is maintained as a picnic area with children’s swing set for use in all weathers.

References

External links

 Stour Row village community website

Villages in Dorset